Charlie Drummond (26 May 1920 – 9 May 1985) was a Scotland international rugby union player. He became the 88th President of the Scottish Rugby Union.

Rugby Union career

Amateur career

Drummond played for Melrose.

Provincial career

He played for South of Scotland District in their match against Australia on 11 October 1947.

International career

He played for Scotland 11 times from 1947 to 1950.

Administrative career

He became the 88th President of the Scottish Rugby Union. He served the standard one year from 1974 to 1975.

References

1923 births
1985 deaths
Melrose RFC players
Presidents of the Scottish Rugby Union
Rugby union players from Scottish Borders
Scotland international rugby union players
Scottish rugby union players
South of Scotland District (rugby union) players
Rugby union centres